In legal procedure (both civil and criminal), misjoinder (also known as wrongful joinder ) involves the improper inclusion of one or more parties or causes of action within a lawsuit. The two forms of misjoinder are:
Misjoinder of causes of action, or counts: joining several demands to enforce substantive rights of recovery that are distinct and contradictory.
 Misjoinder of parties: joining as plaintiffs or defendants persons who have conflicting interests, or who were not involved in the same transaction or event.

United States
According to FRCP, Rule 21,

References

Legal procedure